Spandeck Engineering v Defence Science and Technology Agency [2007] SGCA 37 was a landmark decision in Singapore law. It established a new framework for establishing a duty of care, differentiating the Singaporean law of tort from past English common law precedent such as Caparo v Dickman and Anns v Merton, whilst also allowing for claims in pure economic loss, which are generally not allowed in English law.

Background 
Who, then, in law, is my neighbour?

The Application of English Law Act of 1993 binds some English common law judgments in Singapore courts, but the Singapore judiciary has final jurisdiction over the application and interpretation of the law. Spandeck v DSTA was a departure from the English common law framework for establishing duties of care, replacing Caparo's three-stage test with its own two-stage test distinct from the one in Anns v Merton.

Facts
The Defence Science and Technology Agency (DSTA), a statuory board of the Singapore government, engaged Spandeck Engineering on a contractual basis to work on a construction project. As per statute, DSTA provided a supervisory officer to pay Spandeck according to the terms of contract. Spandeck had underestimated the costs required for the project and subsequent payments to sub-contractors, which went over-budget, were not certified by DSTA. Spandeck was unable to pay its own contractors with the money that it was given, and negotiations were conducted to revise the contract. These negotiations fell through, and Spandeck decided instead to novate its contract to a third-party, thereby forfeiting a right to arbitration under an arbitration clause. After, Spandeck sued DSTA for damages, alleging that it had a "duty of care ... in certifying, in a fair and unbiased manner, payment for work... to avoid causing it any loss due to undervaluation and under-certification of works".

Judgment
The Court of Appeal ruled that for a duty of care to be owed, a two-stage test can be applied, comprising proximity and policy. In determining legal proximity, the court considered two formulations: Justice Deane's formulation in Sutherland Shire Council v Heyman comprising physical, circumstantial, and causal proximity; and the "twin criteria" of voluntary assumption of responsibility and reliance outlined in Hedley Byrne. They regarded these formulations, quoting Andrew Phang, as "two different... sides of the same coin and ought therefore to be viewed in an integrated and holistic fashion." Policy considerations allowed the court to negate a prima facie duty of care, "involving value judgments which reflect differential weighing and balancing of competing moral claims and broad social welfare goals."

Such a test could be applied regardless of what kinds of damages the case involved, and it was intended to be applied in determining a duty of care in any situation, regardless of the kind of loss involved. In establishing the test, the court rejected a categorisational approach towards cases of negligence, instead emphasising common law incrementalism within the two-stage test:Ultimately, a single test to determine the existence of a duty of care for all claims of negligence would do well to eliminate the perception that there are, at once, two or more tests which are equally applicable. While it may be that these tests could yield the same result, their serial applicability diminishes the desirability of having a general principle that can provide a coherent, consistent and reliable way of determining or recognising a duty of care.In addition, a threshold of foreseeability must be met for the test to be applied. Objective foreseeability was not classified as a stage in the test outlined, with the reasoning that "it would be fulfilled in almost all cases" and would be "too wide a criterion to be effective as a legal control mechanism".

Additionally, the court ruled that claims in pure economic loss were allowed in Singapore, diverging from English case law as outlined in Murphy v Brentwood DC. Chief justice Chan Sek Keong, in delivering the court's judgment, stated:We respectfully agree that there is no justification for a general exclusionary rule against recovery of all economic losses and indeed, this is already the position the Singapore courts have taken, following Ocean Front... Although the Singapore decisions on pure economic loss have largely been restriction to such situations [concerning the economic value of land in near-contractual relationships], there is no reason not to extend liability for pure economic loss to other situations, provided the issues of indeterminate liability and policy can be adequately dealt with. With regard to the present case, whilst the court found foreseeability, it found that proximity did not exist between Spandeck and DSTA, owing to the arbitration clause in contract. Quoting the previous judgment of Pacific Associates, the court affirmed that: [I]t would not be reasonable [for the court in Pacific Associates] to impose a Hedley Byrne duty... because "it would cut across and be inconsistent with the structure of relationships created by the contracts, into which the parties had entered... The court in Pacific Associates also held that the engineer did not owe a duty of care to a contractor who had suffered economic loss... as the contractor was safeguarded by the terms of its contract with the employer. Purchas LJ considered that the courts should be slow to superimpose an added duty of care in excess of the rights the contractor was content to acquire... [I]f the contractor required extra-contractual protection for the deafaults of the engineer, it was open to the contractor to stipulate for it when contracting. By accepting the invitation to tender the contractor must be taken to accept the role to be played by the engineer as defined in the contract.

Analysis and Development 
Spandeck laid a universal foundation of establishing a duty of care in Singapore law, and subsequent cases relied upon its framework to determine duties. This framework is different from that in Caparo in that Caparo advocated for an incrementalist approach in determining duty of care, where categories of duties are established based on cases, and duties are determined based on similarities to past cases. Spandeck, on the other hand, asserted a universal test that was independent of past decisions, using precedent as an aid in determining duty. Spandeck also differed from the framework found in Anns, which affirmed a universal test that can determine a duty of care wholly independent of individual considerations.

Spandeck's formulation has been criticised by some academics for its emphasis on proximity, which the courts of some jurisdictions have disregarded as the limb for establishing a prima facie duty of care. Colin Liew, a professor at the National University of Singapore, has criticised Spandeck's as giving rise to "conceptual, analytical and methodological uncertainties" and has argued for a re-examination of the definition of duty of care. In regard to criticism of proximity as a concept, Chan CJ in Spandeck stated:If indeed the "proximity" concept is merely a label or artificial exercise in judicial creativity, then one must ask why the concept is still resorted to or utilised in the various tests. Its very presence suggests that it has some substantive content that is capable of being expressed in terms of legal principles. Rather than denouncing it as a mere "label", the courts should strive to infuse some meaning into it, if only so that lawyers who advise litigants and even law teachers can make some sense of the judicial formulations.The test was later applied by the court of appeal in the context of psychiatric injury in another landmark case, Ngiam Kong Seng v Lim Chiew Hock [2008] SGCA 23.

See also 

 Donoghue v Stevenson
 English tort law

References

Court of Appeal of Singapore cases